The 1952 World Table Tennis Championships – Swaythling Cup (men's team) was the 19th edition of the men's team championship. 

Hungary won the gold medal defeating England 5–4 in the final. Japan and Hong Kong won a bronze medal after finishing second in their respective groups.

Medalists

Swaythling Cup tables

Group A

Group B

+ withdrew

Final

+ Simons picked up an injury during the game against Kóczián and had to concede the match against Sidó. With the match at 4–4, he had no choice but to play his third match with the injury.

See also
List of World Table Tennis Championships medalists

References

-